This is a list of bridges and other crossings of the Connecticut River from its mouth at Long Island Sound upstream to its source at the Connecticut Lakes. The list includes current road and rail crossings, as well as ferries carrying a state highway across the river. Some pedestrian bridges and abandoned bridges are also listed.

Crossings

Source: Fourth Connecticut Lake

See also 

 List of populated places on the Connecticut River

References

Further reading

External links

Bridges in Connecticut
Bridges in Massachusetts
Bridges in New Hampshire
Connecticut River
Connecticut River